Orleans House is a 20th century Grade II* listed building located in Liverpool, England. Originally constructed as a warehouse for the nearby Liverpool Cotton Exchange Building, the building later became offices and more recently has been redeveloped into apartments.

History
Built in 1907 by architecture firm Matear and Simon as a warehouse for the Liverpool Cotton Exchange Building located next door, the building was designed to follow a similar architectural style. In 2016 the building was purchased for £9.6 million by property firm Delph and was converted into 71 residential apartments.

References

Bibliography
 

Grade II* listed buildings in Liverpool
Commercial buildings completed in 1907